Marsela Mari Dela Cruz Guia (born April 28, 2000), also known as Sela Guia, is a Filipino actress, host and singer who is under ABS-CBN's Star Magic. She is a former member of the all-girl Filipino idol group MNL48. After leaving the group, she signed an exclusive contract with Star Magic in their historic "Black Pen Day" on June 19, 2021. Sela has since then continued with her solo singing and acting career. Starting May 2022, Sela became a regular host on PIE Channel's segment PIEsilog and was later on moved to PIEnalo: Pinoy Games.

Career

As a member of MNL48

Sela was born in Laguna, Philippines. At the age of 17, she became a member of MNL48's first generation, which was composed of 48 members and debuted on April 2018.

In 2017, Sela submitted an audition clip online in the nationwide search for the members of AKB48's Filipino sister group MNL48. From a total of 4,134 active applicants, she was one of the 200 girls that passed the initial auditions, which was announced on It's Showtime last January 2018.  In April 2018, She ranked third in the first edition of MNL48's general election. As a result, she was a front line performer for the group's debut single,"Aitakatta – Gustong Makita". A month later, she was selected as one of the members of Team L. The following year, she was selected to perform in AKB48 Group Asia Festival in Bangkok, Thailand on January 27, 2019. In April 2019, Sela placed second during the second edition of MNL48's general election, for the group's 4th single, "Ikaw ang Melody". The following month, the Music Video for Igai ni Mango  was released in where Sela was center. Later that year, she was selected to perform in AKB48 Group Asia Festival in Shanghai, China on August 24, 2019.

In November 2020, during her Instagram live, Sela formally announced that she will withdraw her candidacy from the third edition of MNL48's General Election and later leave the group. After her duties and responsibilities she formally left February the next year, making River her last single as a member of the group.

Solo career

In June 19, 2021, a few months after leaving MNL48, Sela signed an exclusive contract with Star Magic on their historic "Black Pen Day". Since then, she has been participating in a lot of Star Magic's gigs and started doing workshops with them. In January 2020, Sela appeared on ASAP Natin ‘To stage for a Star Magic Presents performance, marking the start of her solo career. She also appeared in the "Star Magic 30 All-Star Games" as part of the Star Hunt Volleyball Team last May 23, 2022. On the same month, Sela started her hosting career after the announcement that she will be part of PIE Channel's segment PIEsilog as a PIE jock (host), together with Frances Cabatuando, Tristan Ramirez, Raco Ruiz, Jae Miranda, and Eryka Lucas. In October 2022, Sela was moved to a new segment PIEnalo:Pinoy Games together with Eian Rances, Negi, Kevin Montillano, Nicki Morena, Ruth Paga, and Nonong Ballinan. In November 27, 2022, Sela became a guest host on the Dream Maker Online Hub with Sheena Belarmino.

Starting January 9, 2023, Sela, together with Jhai Ho and Gabb Skribikin will be the Dream Maker Pie Jocks on Dream Maker's weekdays variety show Pause & Play on PIE Channel.

Acting career 
In June 14, 2020, Sela made her television debut when she starred in Ipaglaban Mo!: Yes Sir as Tiffany.

In February 2022, it was announced that Sela will play the role of Nica in the TVDG digital movie PILIkula: "Her Story" with Ella Cayabyab, and Sky Quizon. They've won the role via the KUMU campaign spearheaded by Star Hunt. This is her second TVDG digital movie after "2020 Vision" where she played Erika back in 2020, co-starring Ecka Sibug as Sandy.Earlier that year she also played the role of Marnie in the iWant Series "Goodbye Girl", which served as her web series debut. On July 2022, Sela made a quick appearance in the film "The Entitled" starring Alex Gonzaga and JC de Vera. It is her first appearance on Netflix and her third appearance in the big screen after her cameo scene in "Kun maupay man it panahon"  last 2021 and the documentary film about MNL48, ICYMI: I See Me last 2019.

Early life and education
Sela was born in Laguna, Philippines. Ever since young, Sela has always been keen into becoming a dancer, singer, and an actress. She is currently taking up a Bachelor's Degree of Science in Tourism Management in St. Paul University Manila.

Works

Discography

Collaboration

MNL48

Filmography

Films and Series

Television shows

As a member of MNL48

As a solo artist

Web shows

As a member of MNL48

As a solo artist

References

External links
 
 
 
 
 
 

MNL48
Filipino singers
Filipino actresses

2000 births
Living people